Alexanders is a two-story, Second Renaissance Revival style commercial building designed by architects Tourtellotte & Hummel and constructed in Boise, Idaho, in 1924. The brick building is clad in white terracotta.

Alexanders was a men's clothing store chain begun in 1891 by Moses Alexander. After construction, the building at 826 Main Street contained Alexanders' flagship store, although Alexanders had operated a store prior to 1924 at the same corner.

The building was listed on the National Register of Historic Places in 1978.

References

External links

Documentation at the Library of Congress
Alexander Davis Men's Clothing website: history

Buildings and structures in Boise, Idaho